Dr George Gordon MacPherson was Reader in Experimental Pathology, Turnbull Fellow, Tutor in Medicine, and Senior Tutor at Oriel College, Oxford. He held a Bachelor's degree (B.M.), Master's degree (M.A.) and a doctorate (D.Phil.). His research interests were in Cell Biology, Pathology, and Immunology. Medically qualified, he researched in the field of cellular immunology at the Sir William Dunn School of Pathology, University of Oxford.

He is recognized for his "pioneering work" on the modulation of the adaptive immune response by sub-populations of antigen-presenting dendritic cells, including a sub-population of dendritic cells which presents self-antigens derived from apoptotic gastrointestinal epithelial cells and helps maintain self-tolerance. This contrasts with the role of other dendritic cells in presenting pathogen-derived antigens in order to activate specific anti-pathogen T-cell and B-cell responses.

He died on 14 November 2021.

Publications
As at December 2021, his ten most cited research publications are:

  Cited 766 times.
  Cited 706 times.
  Cited 482 times.
  Cited 360 times.
  Cited 297 times.
  Cited 264 times.
  Cited 263 times.
  Cited 207 times.
  Cited 168 times.
  Cited 160 times.

References

20th-century births
2021 deaths
Fellows of Oriel College, Oxford
British pathologists
British immunologists
21st-century English medical doctors
Year of birth missing